Mesocyon ("middle dog") is an extinct genus of the Hesperocyoninae subfamily of early canids native to North America. Fossils are known from Oregon, southern California and the northern Great Plains. It was roughly coyote-sized, and the first known canid to have a primarily meat-based diet.

References

Hesperocyonines
Oligocene canids
Aquitanian genus extinctions
Miocene carnivorans
White River Fauna
Prehistoric carnivoran genera
Rupelian genus first appearances